Ouanalao FC is a Barthéloméen football club based in Anse du Grand Cul-de-Sac quartier. The club plays in the Saint-Barthelemy Championships, where they finished 5th during the 2014–15 season. That season they also won the Trophée José da Silva, the domestic cup on the island.

Honors 

 Trophée José da Silva: 2014–15

References

External links 
 Official website

Ouanalao